Eagris hereus, commonly known as the beautiful orange flat, is a species of butterfly in the family Hesperiidae. It is found in Guinea, Sierra Leone, Ivory Coast, Ghana, Togo, Nigeria, Cameroon, Gabon, Angola and the Central African Republic. The habitat consists of forests.

Adults are attracted to flowers.

Subspecies
Eagris hereus hereus - Cameroon, Gabon, Angola, Central African Republic
Eagris hereus quaterna (Mabille, 1890) - Guinea, Sierra Leone, Ivory Coast, Ghana, Togo, Nigeria, western Cameroon

References

Butterflies described in 1875
Tagiadini
Butterflies of Africa
Taxa named by Herbert Druce